In enzymology, a retinol O-fatty-acyltransferase is an enzyme that catalyzes the chemical reaction

acyl-CoA + retinol  CoA + retinyl ester

Thus, the two substrates of this enzyme are acyl-CoA and retinol, whereas its two products are CoA and retinyl ester.

This enzyme belongs to the family of transferases, specifically those acyltransferases transferring groups other than aminoacyl groups.  The systematic name of this enzyme class is acyl-CoA:retinol O-acyltransferase. Other names in common use include retinol acyltransferase, and retinol fatty-acyltransferase.  This enzyme participates in retinol metabolism.

References

 
 

EC 2.3.1
Enzymes of unknown structure